Elsa García may refer to:

 Elsa García (singer), Mexican-American singer
 Elsa García (gymnast) (born 1990), Mexican gymnast